The Northeast Kingdom Human Services (NKHS) is a US Government Contractor which is tasked with providing social services to people in the Northeast Kingdom, Vermont. These services include help with: chronic mental illness, developmental disabilities, substance abuse problems and other mental health and medical psychiatric needs.

It employed 480 workers in 2009. It had offices in Newport and St. Johnsbury.

In 2013, 200 employees moved to a  facility in Derby.

References

External links 

 Official website

Northeast Kingdom, Vermont
Addiction organizations in the United States
Mental health organizations in Vermont